Rhoda is a female given name, originating in both Greek and Latin. Its primary meaning is "rose" but it can also mean "from Rhodes", the Greek island originally named for its roses. The name was mostly used in the 18th and 19th centuries but goes back at least to the first century as it is recorded in the New Testament of the Bible (see Rhoda (biblical figure)).

People

Politicians 
 Rhoda Grant (born 1963), Scottish Labour Member of the Scottish Parliament
 Rhoda Fox Graves (1877–1950), American suffragist, woman's rights activist, and pioneering female Republican politician
 Rhoda Jacobs (born 1937), American member of the New York State Assembly
 Rhoda Moy-Crawford (born 1989), Jamaican politician
 Rhoda Perry (born 1943), member of the Rhode Island Senate

Writers 
 Rhoda Broughton (1840–1920), Welsh novelist
 Rhoda Shipman (born 1968), American comic book writer
 Rhoda Truax (1901–2000), American author

Scientists 
 Rhoda Alani (born 1964), American oncologist
 Rhoda Bubendey Métraux (1914–2003), anthropologist

Actresses 
 Rhoda Gemignani (born 1940), American actress
 Rhoda Griffis (born 1965), American actress
 Rhoda Jordan (born 1979), African-American actress
Rhoda Montemayor (born 1979) English actress
Rhoda Williams (1930 - 2006), American actress

Singers and musicians 
 Rhoda Chase (1914–1978), American blues singer
 Rhoda Dakar (born 1958), British singer and musician, lead singer of the Bodysnatchers
 Rhoda Hutchinson, a member of the Hutchinson Family Singers, a group popular in the 1840s
 Rhoda Scott (born 1938), African-American hard bop and soul jazz organist

Other 
 Rhoda Abbott (1873–1946), only female passenger to go down with the  Titanic and survive
 Rhoda Billings (born 1937), American lawyer and a former justice of the North Carolina Supreme Court
 Rhoda Haas Goldman (1924–1996), American philanthropist and heiress
 (Rhoda) Lavinia Goodell (1839–1880), the first woman licensed to practice law in Wisconsin
 Rhoda Holmes Nicholls (1854–1930), British-born American painter
 Rhoda Pritzker (1914–2007), British-American philanthropist
 Rhoda Richards (1784–1879), wife of Mormon leader Joseph Smith and, after his death, Brigham Young
 Rhoda Wise (1888–1948), American alleged stigmatist

Fictional characters 
 Rhoda Dendron, on the animated television series Darkwing Duck
 Rhoda Penmark, in William March's novel The Bad Seed
 Rhoda Morgenstern, title character of the television show Rhoda
 Rhoda, in The Waves
 Rhoda, in 12 Oz. Mouse
 Rhoda Williams, protagonist of the 2011 movie Another Earth
 Rhoda Swartz, in William Thackeray's novel Vanity Fair
 Rhoda Henry, in the novels The Winds of War and War and Remembrance and the two miniseries

See also 
 Rhonda

External links 
 Meaning of Rhoda

English given names
English feminine given names
Given names derived from plants or flowers